The Cracksman's Gratitude is a 1914 American drama silent black and white film directed by Anthony O'Sullivan and starring Lionel Barrymore and Claire McDowell.

References

External links
 

Films directed by Anthony O'Sullivan
Silent American drama films
1914 drama films
1914 films
American silent short films
American black-and-white films
Biograph Company films
General Film Company
1910s American films